Hakim Taniwal (Pashto: حکيم تڼيوال) was the Governor of Paktia province in Afghanistan until he was killed by a suicide bomber on 10 September 2006, at the age of 60. Prior to his governorship of Paktia, Taniwal had governed the difficult province of Khost, near the border with Pakistan, where al-Qaeda had established training camps during the time of the Taliban and later took refuge in the Tora Bora mountains.

Taniwal was an Afghan exile in Australia with his family before returning to Afghanistan to take the governorship. Lacking the military background, and the associated questionable human rights record, of so many of the country's past and present politicians, Taniwal was considered an effective and honest administrator before his death. He brought Shaikh Zayed University to Khost and he signed the contract of Khost-Gardez Pass road for these religious people by his struggles.

See also
List of Afghan Transitional Administration personnel
List of Afghanistan Governors
Assadullah Wafa
Tani, Afghanistan
 Amb (princely state)

Sources and notes

Further reading
abc.net.au article Assassination could destabilise east Afghanistan published 11 September 2006 "Governor Taniwal is the highest-ranking Afghan official to be killed since the Taliban insurgency began."

Governors of Paktia Province
2006 deaths
Pashtun people
Assassinated Afghan politicians
Afghan expatriates in Australia
Afghan exiles
Terrorism deaths in Afghanistan
Afghan terrorism victims
1946 births